Pristimantis pardalis is a species of frog in the family Strabomantidae.
It is found in Costa Rica and Panama.
Its natural habitats are tropical moist lowland forests and moist montane forests.
It is threatened by habitat loss.

References

pardalis
Amphibians of Costa Rica
Amphibians of Panama
Amphibians described in 1928
Taxonomy articles created by Polbot